This is a list of the tallest dams in the world over  in height. The tallest embankment dam and second tallest dam in the world is the  Nurek Dam in Tajikistan. The tallest natural dam, the  Usoi Dam in Tajikistan, is  taller than the tallest existing man-made one.

Existing

Under construction

Gallery

Notes 
 A 300m and 280m tall design under consideration
 Non-realized project of Soviet-era
 Construction stopped as a result of Gulf war

References 

Dams